The VelociPastor is a 2017 American comedy horror film written, directed, and edited by Brendan Steere. The plot follows pastor Doug Jones who becomes infected by an artifact, resulting in him turning into a velociraptor when he becomes angry. After screening at the B-Movie, Underground, and Trash (BUT) Film Festival on August 31, 2018, the film received a wide release in the United States on August 13, 2019, by Wild Eye Releasing.

Plot
Catholic priest Doug Jones witnesses his parents die in a car fire. He travels to China on a spiritual journey and comes across ninjas searching for an artifact said to turn people into the Dragon Warrior. After becoming infected by the artifact, Doug begins having nightmares and goes out into the forest late at night as he transforms into a dinosaur. He saves Carol, a prostitute, from a thug.

Waking up in Carol's bed naked, with no memory of the night before, Doug initially believes they had sex, but after Carol tells him what happened he realizes the truth. Unpersuaded by her suggestion to use his new power to fight crime and get rid of people they believe are beyond spiritual salvation, he returns to the church for confessions; speaking to Frankie Mermaid, Carol's pimp, he learns  Mermaid is the one responsible for killing Doug's parents.

Enraged, Doug proceeds to kill Mermaid and, now convinced about her plan to fight crime, returns to Carol needing her assistance. Father Stewart, learning of Doug's new power, encourages Doug to lose it and stop killing. He takes him to see Altair, an exorcist, hoping to remove Doug's power. In a flashback, we learn Father Stewart saw a war buddy shot while off guard and that his love interest was killed in an accident. Back in the present, the exorcism fails and Doug transforms, taking one of Father Stewart's eyes.

Returning to Carol, Doug is confronted by ninjas. Father Stewart wakes up in a camp of drug-dealing Christian ninjas, led by Wei Chan who plans to sell highly addictive cocaine to people and then cut off supplies. Wei Chan hopes this will lead the addicts to turn to the church where he will eventually take over and use them as his army. Father Stewart rejects this idea and is killed. Doug and Carol are  confronted by ninjas and plan to stop Wei Chan.

Doug is stopped by Sam the White Ninja, who he later realizes is his brother. Doug catches Sam off guard and uses telekinesis to take Sam's sword and kill him. Doug and Carol fight off more ninjas and are badly wounded. Doug,  fighting off the remaining ninjas, is shot by Wei Chan with an arrow containing anti-venom to stop his transformation. Doug's hands are immune to the anti-venom and he proceeds to kill Wei Chan using his velociraptor powers, among other techniques. Doug carries Carol to the hospital where she recovers.

Doug, no longer a priest with a bounty on his head, plans on traveling the world with Carol and continuing their original idea of killing off criminals.

Cast

Production
Brendan Steere came up with the idea in 2010 while he was attending the School of Visual Arts in Manhattan, after his phone autocorrected "Velociraptor" to "Veloci Pastor". As a class project, Steere made a short film of fake grindhouse trailers which included The VelociPastor. His prior YouTube videos had around 45 views each, but the class project received around 45,000 views, resulting in the feature film idea. Steere stated, "The movie is made to be fun, and anybody looking for deeper meaning in the man-turns-into-a-dinosaur genre is probably on a fool's errand."

From 2011 to 2016, two attempts to crowdfund were made, first through Kickstarter and then through Seed&Spark. The film received funding from a private investor that the mother of Steere's friend knew.

Filmed on a budget of $36,000, Steere was influenced by director Guillermo del Toro.

Release
The VelociPastor premiered in Portland, Oregon on November 2, 2017. After being shown at various film festivals, the crew signed with sales agency Cyfuno Ventures who then brokered a deal with Wild Eye Releasing in 2018.

Home media
The film was released on region 1 DVD and streaming on August 13, 2019. The film is also available on Amazon Prime, YouTube and Roku. A Blu-ray was released on September 17, 2019.

Reception
On Rotten Tomatoes the film has an approval rating of 61% based reviews from 18 critics, with an average rating of 5.5/10.

Alex McLevy, writing for The A.V. Club, said, "This movie is going to endure. It's got a killer hook, is fun to watch, and doesn't overstay its welcome. It has 'cult classic' written all over it." Michael Walsh of Nerdist said, "Is the movie good enough to be considered a truly great comedy? No, probably not. but it's still way better than most people would expect." Amanda Sink from The Hollywood Outsider said "Albeit no cinematic achievement, The VelociPastor is a hysterically ludicrous horror-comedy that knows its absurdity and has no qualms inviting you in." Jeffrey Lyles on Lyles' Movie Files reports "It's either the most absurd and ridiculous premise for a movie or the movie you've been waiting all of 2019 to see." Bobby LePire, for Film Threat, writes "Brendan Steere, his delightful cast, and committed crew have crafted a bonkers film that never stops entertaining." Michael Mulcahy of Kings Path claims that "this movie adequately serves the purpose of trash TV to watch in the evening while waiting for your wife to come home from Bible Study. You'll have plenty to talk about".

Sequel 
Steere has stated that he wants to do a sequel as he believes the world of VelociPastor is "so permissible and fun". In March 2020, Steere shared a sneak peek of the script on Twitter, making the announcement that the script was completed and is set to start filming at some point.

References

External links

 
 

2017 films
2010s comedy horror films
American independent films
2017 independent films
Films about dinosaurs
Films about shapeshifting
American comedy horror films
2017 comedy films
Ninja films
2010s English-language films
2010s American films